The Pawtucket Congregational Church is a historic church at 15 Mammoth Road in Lowell, Massachusetts.  It sits across Massachusetts Route 113 from the Merrimack River at Pawtucket Falls on the site at which the Pennacook sachem Passaconaway once lived.

The church was gathered in 1797 by those who did not wish to travel to the center of Dracut for worship.  Pawtucketville was part of Dracut when the church was founded.  The current church building was erected in 1898, and exhibits Queen Anne and Romanesque Revival styling; its tower houses a bell cast by the Revere foundry in 1822. The building was listed on the National Register of Historic Places  in 2007.

Pawtucket Congregational Church is an open and affirming congregation of the United Church of Christ.

See also
National Register of Historic Places listings in Lowell, Massachusetts

References

External links
Church website

United Church of Christ churches in Massachusetts
Churches on the National Register of Historic Places in Massachusetts
Churches in Lowell, Massachusetts
National Register of Historic Places in Lowell, Massachusetts